Birmingham Moor Street, also known as Moor Street station, is one of three main railway stations in the city centre of Birmingham, England, along with Birmingham New Street and Birmingham Snow Hill.

Today's Moor Street station is a combination of the original station, opened in 1909 by the Great Western Railway as a terminus for local trains, and a newer Moor Street station with through platforms, a short distance from the original, which opened in 1987, replacing the original. The two were combined into one station in 2002, when the original was reopened and restored, and the newer station rebuilt in matching style.

Moor Street has become more important in recent years; two of the original terminus platforms were reopened in 2010, and the station is now the terminus of many Chiltern Railways services from London Marylebone, as well as being an important stop for local services on the Snow Hill Lines. It is now the second busiest railway station in Birmingham.

History

Earlier history (1909-1987)
At the turn of the 20th century, suburban rail traffic into Birmingham was growing rapidly. The Great Western Railway (GWR) greatly expanded their facilities in the city at that time to cope with the demands. Snow Hill station, their main station in Birmingham, was extensively rebuilt and expanded. However, the twin tracked Snow Hill tunnel, which ran underneath the city centre into Snow Hill from the south, did not have enough capacity to accommodate all of the traffic, and widening the tunnel was considered impractical. In order to solve the capacity problem therefore, Moor Street station was built at the opposite end of the tunnel to take terminating local trains from the south and relieve traffic.

It was opened with temporary buildings in July 1909, and the permanent buildings were completed in 1914. The station was located south of the entrance to Snow Hill tunnel, at the end of a short branch (the Moor Street branch) which connected the station to the main line. It originally had a single 700 ft (213 metre) long island platform with two platform faces. A third side platform, 600 ft (183 metres) long was added in 1930. The through tracks to Snow Hill running alongside, however, were not provided with platforms.

Because the station was built on a confined site, it was equipped with two electrically operated traversers at the buffer end of the platforms as a space saving measure, in order to allow locomotives to move sideways between tracks, instead of having to reverse through crossovers. The traversers were removed from service in 1967, when all services to the station switched to diesel multiple unit operation.

Trains only used Moor Street during Mondays to Saturdays, on Sundays, Snow Hill station was quiet enough to allow the train to terminate there instead.

In 1948, upon nationalisation, Moor Street came under the control of the Western Region of British Railways, transferring to the London Midland Region, in 1963.

Snow Hill station was run down during the late 1960s, and on 4 March 1968 the line between the junction with the Moor Street branch and Birmingham Snow Hill, including Snow Hill tunnel closed, leaving Moor Street as an isolated terminus for local trains. Moor Street itself came under threat of closure in 1969, however five local authorities objected and took the case to the High Court, which sided with the local authorities, preventing closure.

From 1967 until the mid-1970s, Moor Street was at its lowest ebb; the infrequent local trains used Moor Street during peak hours only, at other times they ran to and from New Street. In the 1970s, local services from the station came under the control of the West Midlands Passenger Transport Executive (WMPTE) under whose auspices service frequencies were improved.

Goods station

Moor Street was originally provided with a large goods station situated adjacent to the passenger station, which opened in 1914. The GWR purchased and demolished a number of buildings, including the old Public Office to make way for it. It was built using the increasingly rare Hennebique technique for reinforced concrete. The goods station handled many goods trains which would otherwise have passed through Snow Hill tunnel to the GWR's goods depot at Hockley. Because it was built in a confined space on a steep gradient, the goods station was built on two levels, with one high level, and two low level sheds. Three wagon lifts were provided to transfer wagons to and from the low level sheds. The low level sheds were equipped with electric traversers to move wagons between the lifts and sidings where they would be loaded and unloaded.

A major source of traffic at the goods station was fresh fruit and vegetables, which would arrive at the station in the mornings, and be taken straight to the nearby market in the Bull Ring. The goods station was finally closed on 6 November 1972, and the main high-level shed was demolished three years later. The site of the former goods station is now partly occupied by the Selfridges Building, and some of the former low-level goods sheds are now used as a car-park.

Relocation

In the mid-1980s funding became available to reopen a station at Birmingham Snow Hill, along with Snow Hill tunnel. As part of the reopening scheme, a new Moor Street station with through platforms was built at the southern portal of the restored tunnel. On completion of this project, the original Moor Street terminus became redundant, and closed down. The final train, on 26 September 1987, was a steam special hauled by a locomotive from Birmingham Railway Museum, Clun Castle. The old platforms were disconnected from the network, and the new through station came into use on 5 October 1987.

In the 1990s the range of services stopping at Moor Street were expanded for the first time since it opened. In 1993, limited stop Network SouthEast services were introduced from London Marylebone to Snow Hill via Banbury and Leamington Spa, stopping at Moor Street, thus making Moor Street a main line station for the first time. This service was taken over by Chiltern Railways following privatisation. In 1995, the completion of the "Jewellery Line" project north of Snow Hill, meant that through services to Worcester via  and Kidderminster were introduced.

Restoration
The original station was not demolished but was mothballed and allowed to deteriorate. By the late 1990s, the former platforms were overgrown and dilapidated, and cracks in the wall were visible from the road side, including some caused by the impact of a runaway bus. In March 1988 the "Moor Street Station Historical Society" was formed to "Save Our Station". Dr Bernard Juby, a medical practitioner from nearby Yardley, became its Chairman and immediately set about campaigning for the station and its warehousing to be listed. Large teams of volunteers met each week-end to clean and preserve the various buildings. The existing artifacts were carefully renovated and stored and were subsequently re-used when the station reopened to the public. As a result of their efforts the old station became Grade II listed in 1998. The inspector from English Heritage visited the site in 1988 and agreed that both station and warehouses should be Listed, but it took a further 10 years and (with the help of Councillors Sir Stan Yapp and Fred Chapman) a 14,500+ signature petition to Birmingham City Council before the Secretary of State signed it off.

In the 2000s, the growth in services on the Snow Hill Lines again strained capacity through Snow Hill tunnel, and so Chiltern Railways and the Birmingham Alliance decided to restore the original terminus and reopen it, to allow some services to terminate there rather than Snow Hill. Between 2002 and 2003 the original Moor Street station building and platforms were renovated and restored to a 1930s style at a cost of £11 million. However, there was a long delay before the old terminal platforms were connected to the network and opened for service, because of delays in carrying out the necessary signalling work by Network Rail. Two of the three former terminal platforms, numbered 3 and 4, were reopened for use on 11 December 2010. The third bay platform 5 remains disused.

The restoration project also unified the original station and the 1980s station into one. The main 1980s station entrance was demolished, and a new passenger access was created to the through platforms using the old station's ticket hall. The footbridge and canopies on the through platforms were also rebuilt to match the style of the original station.

Refurbished in 1930s style, the station has reproduction lamps, clock, seating, and signage. The renovation won the Railway Heritage Trust award for 2004 and The Birmingham Civic Society's Renaissance Award for 2005.  The station became home to the cosmetically restored second GWR 2884 Class 2-8-0 No. 2885, which, until being removed on 4 June 2013, stood in the disused platform five. Further renovations during 2011–12 included the installation of GWR-inspired gilt signage on the front and side elevations of the station building.

Since the December 2010 timetable change, two of the three south facing bay platforms at Moor Street station are now connected to the network and in use, enabling some of the Chiltern services to and from London Marylebone to terminate at Moor Street instead of Snow Hill. Local Chiltern stopping services to Leamington Spa will also begin and terminate at the new terminal platforms. Chiltern Railways are engaged in a large-scale redevelopment of their route from London Marylebone to Birmingham with improvements to allow higher speeds.

A fast train service between Moor Street and London Marylebone was introduced on 5 September 2011 using locomotive-hauled coaches, furthering the competition with Virgin Trains' West Coast Main Line services from Birmingham New Street.

Services 

Moor Street is currently served by West Midlands Railway who run local services on the Snow Hill Lines, and by Chiltern Railways who run longer distance services to London Marylebone via the Chiltern Main Line:

Chiltern Railways
Some of the Chiltern London services terminate at Snow Hill, calling at Moor Street's through platforms, while other services terminate at Moor Street's terminal platforms. Some of the through Chiltern services continue beyond Birmingham to  during peak hours. The Chiltern service is:
A two-hourly stopping service to Leamington Spa

West Midlands Railway
Six West Midlands Railway trains per hour call at Moor Street in each direction, running as follows:

Eastbound:

 3 trains per hour to :
of which one continues to 
 3 trains per hour to 
of which one continues to 
in peak hours some West Midlands Railway services continue from Dorridge to Leamington Spa.

Westbound:

 6 trains per hour to :
of which four continue to :
of which two continue to 
(services beyond Worcester, to Malvern and Hereford are irregular, generally about one per hour)

On summer Sundays, Moor Street is used by steam locomotives running tourist specials between Snow Hill and Stratford upon Avon and trains between Snow Hill and Tyseley run by Vintage Trains.

Links to New Street station

Moor Street station is 400 yards (365 metres) away from New Street station; the city's main railway station. There is a signposted route for passengers travelling between New Street and Moor Street stations which involves a short walk through a tunnel under the Bullring shopping centre. Although the railway lines into New Street pass directly underneath Moor Street station, there is no track connection. In 2013 a new direct walkway was opened between the two stations making interchange easier.

Proposed future developments

Plans are being pursued to introduce new services into Moor Street by constructing new chords linking the station to the Camp Hill Line, which is currently mostly used by freight trains. The currently disused third bay platform would be reopened, and an additional new fourth bay platform would be opened to accommodate the new services.

In a West Midlands & Chiltern Routes Study, it is proposed that services to the South West (via Worcester) and the East Midlands (Nottingham and Leicester), will be rerouted into Moor Street from New Street after the construction of the Camp Hill Chords.

Network Rail have predicted that the number of passengers using Moor Street will grow to 8.9 million per year by 2023, and then to over 12 million by 2043.

The High Speed 2's Birmingham city centre terminus, Birmingham Curzon Street railway station is planned to be built adjacent to Moor Street station.

In March 2019, plans were revealed to redevelop Moor Street station which include a new footbridge to link all 6 platforms with the planned HS2 station and two new platforms (5 and 6), this is to get ready for re-routing of services from East Midlands, South West, Worcester and Hereford to Moor Street.

On the 26 June 2019, plans were submitted to the Department for Transport to get funding for the £2 billion investment programme known as the Midlands Rail Hub. Plans for Moor Street included:
 two new platforms (5 and 6)
 two extra commuter services per hour from  via the Camp Hill Line
 one extra train per hour to 
 one extra train per hour to  via Worcester
 one extra train per hour to 
 one extra train per hour to

See also 
 Transport in Birmingham
 Transport for West Midlands
 Birmingham Snow Hill railway station
 Birmingham New Street railway station
 Chiltern Main Line
 North Warwickshire Line

References

External links 

Birmingham Civic Society
Vintage Trains page

Rail Around Birmingham and the West Midlands: Birmingham Moor Street railway station
Warwickshire Railways page
Moor Street station
Moor Street railway station layout

Grade II listed buildings in Birmingham
DfT Category B stations
Grade II listed railway stations
Railway stations in Birmingham, West Midlands
Former Great Western Railway stations
Railway stations in Great Britain opened in 1909
Railway stations served by Chiltern Railways
Railway stations served by West Midlands Trains
Disused railway goods stations in Great Britain